Emepronium (as emepronium bromide) is an anticholinergic drug used in urology as an antispasmodic.
It can cause ulceration of esophagus, so it should be taken in orthostatic position with sufficient amounts of liquids.

References 

Muscarinic antagonists
Quaternary ammonium compounds